Emilie Jane Cocquerel is an Australian actress and mental health advocate. She earned a Daytime Emmy Award nomination for her performance as Sandy in the ABC Me series The New Legends of Monkey (2018–2020). She is also known for her roles in the film Mother Mountain (2022) and as Queen Alianor in the Netflix series The Letter for the King (2020).

Early life and education
Cocquerel was born in Sydney to Australian mother Georgia and French father Patrick. Her older brother Thomas and younger sisters Elsa and Anna are also actors. She spent her early childhood in France and the United States before returning to Sydney in 2001, settling in the North Shore suburb of Warrawee.

Cocquerel began her studies at Sydney University where she participated in the Drama Society and later graduated with a Bachelor of Arts in Acting from the Western Australian Academy of Performing Arts in 2013. She also took a three month course at the Conservatoire national supérieur d'art dramatique. Having developed an interest in mental health care and social work, she returned to university, graduating with a Bachelor of Social Science in Psychology from Swinburne University of Technology in 2019 followed by a Master of Counselling and Psychotherapy from the Australian College of Applied Psychology in 2021.

Filmography

Film

Television

Stage

Awards and nominations

References

External links
 
 Emilie Cocquerel at Independent Talent

Living people
21st-century Australian actresses
Actresses from Sydney
Australian film actresses
Australian people of French descent
Australian television actresses
People from the North Shore, Sydney
Swinburne University of Technology alumni
University of Sydney alumni